The 2022 Bathurst 1000 (known as the 2022 Repco Bathurst 1000 for commercial reasons) was a motor racing event for Supercars held on the week of 6 to 9 October 2022. It hosted the eleventh round of the 2022 Supercars Championship.  It took place at the Mount Panorama Circuit in Bathurst, New South Wales, Australia and featured a single 1000 kilometre race.

Shane van Gisbergen and Garth Tander claimed their second and fifth event Bathurst 1000 victory respectively, in a Triple Eight Race Engineering run Holden Commodore ZB. It was Holden's 36th and final win in their final start at the Bathurst 1000.

Report

Background 
The event was the 65th running of the Bathurst 1000, which was first held at the Phillip Island Grand Prix Circuit in 1960 as a 500-mile race for Australian-made standard production sedans, and marked the 62nd time that the race was held at Mount Panorama. It was the 26th running of the Australian 1000 race, which was first held after the organisational split between the Australian Racing Drivers Club and V8 Supercars Australia that saw two "Bathurst 1000" races contested in both 1997 and 1998.

It was the final time that Holden would participate in the Bathurst 1000, who made their debut in the 1961 Armstrong 500 event at Phillip Island, after General Motors announced the retirement of the brand in 2020.

Chaz Mostert and Lee Holdsworth were the defending race winner. Mostert remained at Walkinshaw Andretti United, while Holdsworth moved to Grove Racing as a full time driver.

Entry list 
Twenty-eight cars entered the event - 19 Holden Commodores and nine Ford Mustangs, making it the biggest grid since 2013. In addition to the 25 regular entries, three wildcard entries were entered. One from Erebus Motorsport, for Greg Murphy and Richie Stanaway, one from Matt Chahda Motorsport, for Matt Chahda and Jaylyn Robotham, and one from Triple Eight Race Engineering, for Craig Lowndes and Declan Fraser.

Seven drivers made their Bathurst 1000 debut, ADAC GT Masters driver Jaxon Evans and Super2 drivers Matt Chahda, Declan Fraser, Cameron Hill, Matthew Payne, Jaylyn Robotham and Aaron Seton. For Aaron, he became the first third generation driver to make a Bathurst 1000 appearance, after his father Glenn Seton and his grandfather, 1965 Armstrong 500 race winner, Barry Seton.

Teams Grove Racing, Matt Chahda Motorsport and PremiAir Racing made their debut in the Bathurst 1000.  With Grove Racing a continuation of Kelly Racing, Matt Chahda Motorsport a Super2 Series team and PremiAir Racing an all new team, which took over Team Sydney.

Entries with a grey background are wildcard entries which do not compete in the full championship season.

Results

Qualifying

Top 10 Shootout 
The Top 10 Shootout was cancelled due to inclement weather. It was the first time the Shootout or its predecessor Hardies Heroes was not held since it was introduced in 1978 (in 1988 the Shootout was held but did not count for pole position). As a result, the top ten positions on the grid were determined by the order of the original Friday Qualifying session.

Grid 

 Car #97 received a 3-place grid penalty for a causing a collision in Qualifying.

Race

References

External links
 2022 Repco Spercars Championship Race 30, Supplementary Regulations for Supercars, www.supercars.com, as archived at web.archive.org
 Repco Bathurst 1000 Results, www.supercars.com, as archived at web.archive.org
 2022 Repco Bathurst 1000 Classification, racing.natsoft.com.au, as archived at web.archive.org

Bathurst 1000
2022 in Supercars
Motorsport in Bathurst, New South Wales